Stefan Purtić (born 6 August 1998) is a Serbian professional footballer who plays as a midfielder for Liga I club Petrolul Ploiești.

Career

Early career / Voždovac
Purtić started out his career as a junior with his hometown club Loznica, before moving to the academy of Voždovac in 2012. After being loaned out to third division side Radnički Obrenovac at the start of 2018, he made his Serbian SuperLiga debut in a 0–2 away loss to Mačva Šabac on 4 November that year. 

Purtić spent 2020 on loan at fellow league team Inđija, and after returning to Voždovac became a regular starter and eventually gained team captaincy.

Petrolul Ploiești
On 13 January 2023, Purtić moved abroad for the first time and signed for Romanian side Petrolul Ploiești, recently promoted to the Liga I. He scored his first goal on 27 February, in a 2–5 home loss to defending champions CFR Cluj.

Career statistics

References

External links
Stefan Purtic at Liga Profesionistă de Fotbal 

1998 births
Living people
Sportspeople from Loznica
Serbian footballers
Association football midfielders
Serbian SuperLiga players
FK Voždovac players
FK Radnički Obrenovac players
FK Inđija players
Liga I players
FC Petrolul Ploiești players
Serbian expatriate footballers
Expatriate footballers in Romania
Serbian expatriate sportspeople in Romania